Vado Ligure, in antiquity Vada Sabatia, is a town and comune in the province of Savona, Liguria, in northern Italy.

Economy 

Vado has a large industrial and commercial port.

Vado Ligure is home to a railway construction plant, founded in 1905 as Società Italiana Westinghouse. In 1919 it was taken over by Tecnomasio Italia Brown Boveri and, since 2001, it has been part of Bombardier Transportation. It currently produces the FS Class E.464 locomotives.

Twin towns
 La Ravoire, France, since 2002

References

Cities and towns in Liguria
Roman towns and cities in Italy